Werner Marti (born 20 April 1957 in Glarus; Place of origin: Sool) is a Swiss lawyer and politician in the Social Democratic Party of Switzerland (SP). He was a member of the Swiss National Council from 1991 until the end of 2008.

Biography 
From 1990 until 1998 he was a member of the Conseil d'État of Glarus. In the SP leadership election of 2004, he was defeated by Hans-Jürg Fehr. From 25 November 1991, Werner Marti was a member of the Swiss National Council.

References

External links 
 
 
 

People from the canton of Glarus
Swiss civil servants
Social Democratic Party of Switzerland politicians
1957 births
Living people